The Hayward Shoreline Interpretive Center is a natural history and ecology interpretive nature center located in Hayward, California. It is directly adjacent to the north side of Highway 92 as it approaches the San Mateo–Hayward Bridge, and is accessed from the highway by the last offramp in the westbound direction before the bridge toll gates. The Center was dedicated in 1986, and is operated by the Hayward Area Recreation and Park District.

Activities
The Center focuses on San Francisco Bay wetland and shoreline ecosystems, and is itself located next to restored wetlands formerly used as salt ponds. The Center operates primarily as a resource center for local schools' educational field trips. It is open to the public on weekends. The center has a small permanent exhibit of native, aquatic life, and rotating exhibits of other related subjects. It is an access point to the San Francisco Bay Trail. Binoculars are on loan for birdwatching. On the other side of Highway 92 is Eden Landing Ecological Reserve, operated by the California Department of Fish and Wildlife.

External links

Hayward Shoreline Interpretive Center at the Hayward Area Recreation and Park District website

Parks in Hayward, California
Nature centers in California
Buildings and structures in Hayward, California
Education in Alameda County, California
Environment of the San Francisco Bay Area
Environmental organizations based in the San Francisco Bay Area
Non-profit organizations based in the San Francisco Bay Area
Scientific organizations established in 1986
1986 establishments in California